José Antônio Correia da Câmara, 2nd <ref>Carlos G. Rheingantz in Anuário Nobiliárquico Brasileiro, "Titulares do Império". Rio de Janeiro, 1960, pages 112 — 121.</ref> was a Brazilian Marshal, noble, and politician who was notable for his participation in the Battle of Cerro Corá in the Paraguayan War.

Biography
Câmara was the son of Commander José Antonio Fernandes de Lima and Flora Correia da Câmara, he was the maternal grandson of the first Viscount of Pelotas .

He enlisted on the 15th of September, 1839 in the 3rd Cavalry Regiment , marching on the same day to fight the Farroupilhas revolutionaries . He also took part in the Platine War, under the orders of Brigadier Manuel Marques de Sousa.

In 1851 he married his niece Maria Rita Fernandes Pinheiro (1829 - 1914), daughter of the Viscount of São Leopoldo, and settled at Solar dos Câmara, in Porto Alegre. They had five children.

In the Uruguayan War in 1864, despite being a cavalryman , he volunteered to participate in the Siege of Paysandú, Uruguay.

Câmara was considered to be a Hero of the Paraguayan War, he helped in the retaking of Uruguaiana and participated in the battles of Curuzu, Curupaiti, Avaí and Campo Grande, among others. His bravery in the Battle of Avaí earned him promotion to Brigadier General. His troops attacked the last Paraguayan camp, in Cerro Corá, where Solano López was wounded and then shot in the banks of the Aquidabã stream. From him came the order of surrender to the Paraguayan dictator, answered with the dismal: "Muero con mi patria!" Câmara was promoted to Marshal in 1870, shortly after the war, in recognition of his services he was awarded the noble title of Viscount of Pelotas.

He was appointed first President of Rio Grande do Sul after the proclamation of the First Brazilian Republic and decorated the following year as Marshal Câmara. He remained in government for only 3 months due to disagreements between members of the Liberal Party and the Republican Party .

His grandson and biographer, wrote the book "O Marechal Câmara", in three volumes, describing the life of the Viscount of Pelotas.

References

Bibliography
MOYA, Savior of. Brazilian Genealogical Yearbook , Year III, p. 249. Brazilian Genealogical Institute, São Paulo, 1944.
PORTO ALEGRE, Aquiles José Gomes Men Illustres of Rio Grande do Sul.'' Selbach Bookstore, Porto Alegre, 1917.
Almanak of the Ministry of War in the Year 1885 , p. 372. National Press, Rio de Janeiro, 1885.

1824 births
1893 deaths
Marshals of Brazil
Liberal Party (Brazil) politicians
Brazilian military personnel of the Paraguayan War
Brazilian nobility
Governors of Rio Grande do Sul
Rio Grande do Sul politicians